The Seger Indian Training School was a historic school on the eastern edge of Colony, Oklahoma. John Homer Seger, a white settler in the Indian Territory, founded the school in 1893. Seger had come to the Darlington Agency in 1875 to work as a teacher, and he established the Seger Colony (the predecessor of Colony) in 1886 with 120 Arapaho. His school taught farming and industrial skills to Native Americans until it closed in 1941; one of the buildings later became Colony's public school.

The school was added to the National Register of Historic Places in 1971; at the time, its buildings were stated to be in poor condition. It was destroyed by fire under mysterious circumstances on September 7, 1971. It was removed from the Register in 1973.

References

School buildings on the National Register of Historic Places in Oklahoma
School buildings completed in 1893
Buildings and structures in Washita County, Oklahoma
National Register of Historic Places in Washita County, Oklahoma

Former_National_Register_of_Historic_Places_in_Oklahoma